Alvania dijkstrai is a species of minute sea snail in the family Rissoidae endemic to the Savage Islands of Portugal.

Description
Sometimes two rows of very vague, light brown dots are visible on the ultimate whorl, one just subsutural and one on the shell base.

Distribution
It is endemic to the Selvagens Archipelago off Northwest Africa.

References

Rissoidae
Gastropods described in 1998